Kalamon may refer to:
Kalamon Province, Greece
Kalamon, Drama, village in Greece
Kalamon, Ivory Coast
Qalamoun Mountains, Syria
Deir Hajla, monastery dedicated to St Gerasimos in Palestine, formerly called Kalamon
Monastery of Saint Samuel the Confessor, called the Monastery of Kalamon, Egypt
Lavra of Kalamon at the Eikoston, Egypt
Kalamon, alternative name for the Kalamata olive